John H. Mason was an American football player and coach. He served as the head football coach at Colorado School of Mines from 1947 to 1946 and at Montana State University from 1950 to 1951, compiling a career college football coach record of 24–40–3. Mason graduated from Oklahoma Agricultural and Mechanical College—now known as Oklahoma State University–Stillwater–in 1925. He lettered in football and wrestling at Oklahoma A&M. Mason became an assistant football coach at University of Colorado Boulder in 1928. There he also coached wrestling.

Head coaching record

College

References

Year of birth missing
Year of death missing
Colorado Buffaloes football coaches
Colorado Mines Orediggers football coaches
Montana State Bobcats football coaches
Oklahoma State Cowboys football players
Oklahoma State Cowboys wrestlers
College wrestling coaches in the United States